Ravi Jhankal is an Indian television, stage and film actor, most known for working in Shyam Benegal's films, including Welcome to Sajjanpur (2008) and Well Done Abba (2010) and for the role of P. V. Narasimha Rao in Pradhanmantri (TV Series). He is also part of Surnai, Mumbai-based theatre group.

He has graduated from National School of Drama, Delhi.

Early Life: Ravi jhankal was born and bought up in Pink City (Jaipur, Rajasthan), in a business family with 5 brother and 3 sister. His father was having a business of cloth retail and stitching. Studied in government school Ravi jhankal was creative and intelligent, he used to participate in most of the school activities. 

His younger brother Trilok kumar jhankal and Vijay Kumar jhankal are still settled in Jaipur. His friend Swarochish Kumar Sharma  is also settled in Pink City. All three used to sit and remember the old good days.

Filmography

Films
 Panchlait (2017)
 NH10 (2015) as Fauji Mama
 Samrat & Co. (2014) as Puran Kaka
 Agneepath (2012)
 Well Done Abba (2010)
 Welcome to Sajjanpur (2008) as Munnibai Mukhanni
 Mangal Pandey: The Rising (2005) as Sufi Singer On Elephant
 Sehar (2005) as Police officer
Paheli (2005) as Supporter against Bhanwarlal (Anupam Kher) with Mohan Bhandari
 Koi Mil Gaya (2003) as Mr Chaturvedi,Maths Teacher
 Hawayein (2003)
 Kyon (2003) as Home Minister Rajiv Desai
 Zubeidaa (2001) as Girivar Singh
 Bawandar (2000) as Police Inspector
 Fiza (2000) as Minister
 Samar (1999) as Chamak Singh
 Sardari Begum (1996) as Police Inspector
 Oh Darling Yeh Hai India (1995)
 Mammo (1994) as Inspector Sapre
 Tarpan  (The Absolution) (1994) as Joravar
 Rudaali (1993)
 City of Joy (1992) as Obstructing Policeman
   Antarnad   (1991)
 Susman (1987)
 Kirayadar (1986)
 Chameli Ki Shaadi (1986)

Television
 Katha Sagar
 Yatra (Doordarshan)
 Mr. Yogi (TV series) as Jitubhai
 Tenali Rama (Doordarshan) as the man who digs a well for Tenali Rama in an episode
 Junoon as Manish Mahajan
 Aahat multiple characters 
 Swabhimaan
 Byomkesh Bakshi (1993) as Amar Raha in the episode Tasvir Chor and Inspector Sarkar in the episodes Chakrant, Dhokadhari, Sahi ka Kanta, Veni Sanhar, and Lohe ka Biscuit
 Uljhan (2008)
 Hitler Didi (2013)
 Devon ke Dev Mahadev (2013) as Lohitang's Guru
 Tehreer…Munsi Premchand Ki-Thakur ka kuan(Doordarshan) as Thakur
 Pradhanmantri (TV Series) (2013) as P. V. Narasimha Rao
 Samvidhaan (2014) as Seth Govind Das
 Bharat Ek Khoj as "Ravi Jhankal", who played the most and some very important roles, which include Laxman, Dusyant, Chandragupta Maurya, Rana Sanga, Prithviraj Chauhan and many more...
 Savdhaan India (2017) in a few episodes
 Ramyug (2020) as a guru maharaj
 Rajjo (2022) as Keshav Singh Thakur

References

External links
 

Indian male film actors
Male actors in Hindi cinema
Indian male television actors
National School of Drama alumni
Indian male stage actors
Living people
20th-century Indian male actors
21st-century Indian male actors
Year of birth missing (living people)